Oak Lawn Farm Dairy Barn is a historic Gothic-arch barn building northeast of Whitewater, Kansas, United States.  It was built in a Late Gothic Revival style in 1926 and was added to the National Register of Historic Places in 2005.  It was deemed "an excellent example of an early twentieth century, bent-rafter gothic roof style barn."

References

Gothic-arch barns
Barns on the National Register of Historic Places in Kansas
Buildings and structures completed in 1926
Buildings and structures in Butler County, Kansas
Gothic Revival architecture in Kansas
Barns in Kansas
National Register of Historic Places in Butler County, Kansas